KBPG may refer to:

 KBPG (FM), a radio station (89.5 FM) licensed to Montevideo, Minnesota, United States
 Big Spring McMahon-Wrinkle Airport (ICAO code KBPG)